Douglas Community School, also known as Douglas Com, The Com or DCS, is an all-boys community school in Douglas, Cork, Ireland. It was founded as Coláiste Muire by the Presentation Brothers in 1926 as a juniorate (i.e. for lower-cycle secondary students). In 1965 it became a full secondary school. In 1974, it became one of the first "community schools" in Ireland, when it was transferred by the Presentation Brothers to a local board of management. The Roman Catholic Bishop of Cork's representatives are trustees on the board of management.
Its uniform is a navy jumper with royal blue and yellow stripes at neckline. The school also hosts adult education evening classes.

On 16 October 2017, during Storm Ophelia, the school gym was damaged and its roof blown off.

Past pupils
 Colin Doyle, association football goalkeeper
 Kieran Healy, sociologist
 Adam Idah, association footballer
 Mick Lynch, rock musician

References

External links
 Douglas Community School Website

Boys' schools in the Republic of Ireland
Secondary schools in County Cork
Educational institutions established in 1926
1926 establishments in Ireland
Community schools in the Republic of Ireland